Grandopronotalia browni is a species of beetle in the family Cicindelidae, the only species in the genus Grandopronotalia.

References

Cicindelidae
Beetles described in 1936